The Ngaliya (Ngalia) are an indigenous Australian people of the Northern Territory who speak a dialect of the Warlpiri language. They are not to be confused with the Ngalia of the Western Desert.

Country
He places them to the north of  Stuart Bluff Range from West Bluff west to  Mounts Cockburn and Carey, at mounts Ethel Creek, Farewell,  Singleton, Saxby and Doreen. Their territory also took in Cockatoo Creek, the Treuer Range, Mount Davenport and Vaughan Springs (aka Pikilji/Pikilyi).

History of contact
Carl Strehlow was the first outsider to mention the Ngalia. Some studies were made of them in August 1931, and in the same month in 1952, at Cockatoo Creek by members of anthropological expeditions from the University of Adelaide. On the first occasion, one Ngalia youth, advancing through the degrees of his initiation, recited a list
of over 300 toponyms referring to the totemic sites along his tribe's dreaming tracks which he had visited the year before as part of his education. The landscape names remained unpublished because of the complexities of pinning down the precise location of each place name in this initiatory journey. Charles P. Mountford published a work detailing the 'totemic topography' marked by the travels of the serpent Jarapiri as it slithered across Warlpiri and Ngalia country, to Wimbaraku, situated between Mount Liebig and Haast's Bluff.

In the early 1950s their numbers were estimated to be 300-400.

Alternative names
 Ngalea
 Ngallia
 Nanbuda
 Ngarilia. (typo)
 Ngali
 Njalia. (a blunder)
 Wawilja. ( Warlpiri exonym)
 Warniaka
 Waneiga. (exonym)
 Nambulatji. (Balgo Gugadja exonym)
 Jalpiri

Notes

Citations

Sources

Aboriginal peoples of the Northern Territory